The 2004–05 season was Newcastle United's 108th season in English football, and their 22nd in the Premier League. The season began poorly for Newcastle, with no wins in their first four matches, and manager Bobby Robson was sacked, bringing to an end his five-year tenure at the club. His assistant, John Carver took over as caretaker manager, managing one win, but was not considered for the permanent post, and left in September 2004. Blackburn Rovers manager Graeme Souness was brought in, but despite a positive start, he was unable to mount a challenge anywhere near the Champions League challenge the team had managed the previous season.

Towards the end of the season, teammates Lee Bowyer and Kieron Dyer were sent off for fighting with each other during a game. Their suspensions, coupled with several injuries, left Newcastle light on players. The club finished in 14th place in the league for the 2004–05 season.

Season summary

After nearly five years in charge, Bobby Robson was dismissed on 30 August, following a largely indifferent start to the season and alleged discontent in the dressing room. The team lost two and drew two of their first four games, three in which they actually surrendered from leading positions: they drew 2–2 at Middlesbrough in the Tyne–Tees derby after taking the lead twice; they surrendered a 2–0 lead against recently promoted Norwich City to draw 2–2 and they surrendered a 2–1 lead at Villa Park to lose 4–2 to Aston Villa. A split had grown between Robson and the club owners when they had made a number of high-profile signings, apparently without consulting him - in particular, that of Patrick Kluivert. He was further undermined by the club's high profile, but ultimately futile, offer for Everton's Wayne Rooney, who instead moved to Manchester United. Following Rooney's transfer, Robson stated his dismay at the tendency for overpaid young players to demand all the perks without proving themselves on the pitch. Events during the ensuing season on and off the pitch would go a long way to confirm Robson's assessment, who was later given a £1 million severance payment by Newcastle.

Graeme Souness, who had guided Blackburn Rovers to the 2002 League Cup trophy and sixth place in the Premiership in recent years, was appointed as Robson's replacement. A ten-match unbeaten run following his appointment suggested that Souness could take Newcastle back to Champions League qualification, but following that the club's form dipped.

Craig Bellamy, a key player in Newcastle's strike force, was loaned to Celtic in January for the remainder of the season, after Souness discovered Bellamy had told teammates he was going to fake an injury. Captain Alan Shearer backed Souness's demand that Bellamy apologise for his behaviour to the whole squad, but he refused to listen. Their dip in performance due to the absence of Shearer through injury worried the fan base, leading to fans debating on whether Bellamy should have departed the club.

In November 2004, club chairman Freddy Shepherd again caused controversy, stating there was no debt owed by the "elite" clubs of the Premiership to the rest of the FA – but with his own team underperforming, this was somewhat ironic as well as inappropriate.

An unbeaten run in all competitions in February and March was ended in April with a home defeat against Aston Villa; during the match, Lee Bowyer and Kieron Dyer were sent off for an on-pitch fight. As a result of the incident, later described as "the blackest day" by Shepherd, Bowyer was fined six weeks' wages (about £200,000) and both players received playing bans from the FA. The event overshadowed the announcement that Alan Shearer (expected to retire that season) had extended his playing contract for a further year and was to take up a coaching role with the club.

A rift opened up between Souness and Shepherd, with Souness complaining that the squad, lacking strength in depth after poor judgment in the transfer market (with the promised major signings not materialising) was not up to the challenge. Souness also criticised the state of the club's training ground, stating it was the main reason why so many injuries had taken their toll on the players.

Cup competitions
Newcastle had qualified for the UEFA Cup with a fifth-placed finish the previous season, and managed to reach the quarter-finals. Newcastle defeated Portuguese side Sporting Lisbon in the home leg, but were most comprehensively outplayed in the away match and lost 4–1, in the process suffering several injuries. In the same week they played Manchester United in an FA Cup semi-final at the Millennium Stadium. The scoreline, again 4–1, reflected the one-sided nature of the encounter. This left the Intertoto Cup as the team's only route into European competition in the 2005–06 season.

Final league table

Team kit
The team kit for the 2004–05 season was produced by Adidas. The main shirt sponsor was Northern Rock.

Club transfers

In

 Total spending:  £19,250,000

Out

 Total income:  £16,300,000

Coaching staff

Players

First-team squad
Squad at end of season

Left club during season

Reserve squad
The following players did not appear for the first-team this season, and made most of their appearances for the reserve team, but may have also appeared for the under-18s.

Under-18 squad
The following players made most of their appearances for the under-18 team, but may have also appeared for the reserves.

Trialists

Appearances, goals and cards
(Starting appearances + substitute appearances)

Matches

Pre-season

Premier League

Results by round

UEFA Cup

FA Cup

League Cup

References

External links
FootballSquads - Newcastle United - 2004/05

Newcastle United
Newcastle United F.C. seasons